Muhammad Sarfaraz Khan Safdar (born; 1914 - 5 May 2009) (Urdu: محمد سرفراز خان صفدر) was a Pakistani, Deobandi Scholar.

Early life and education
Sarfaraz Khan Safdar studied first with Ghulam Ghaus Hazarvi in his hometown. In 1939 he traveled to Darul Uloom Deoband with his brother Sufi Abdul Hameed Swati and studied ahadith under Husain Ahmad Madani.

Honorary titles
 'Safdar' or 'Saf-dar' - Derived from Arabic, mean; "the one who breaks the row/queue". It was given by Husain Ahmad Madani
 'Imam Ahl al-Sunnah' (the Imam of the Ahl al-Sunnah), given by Ahmad al-Rahman, Mufti Wali Hasan Tonki, Muhammad Yusuf Ludhianvi, Nizamuddin Shamzai, Muhammad Jamil Khan, Zar Wali Khan, Mufti Muhammad Naeem and Muhammad Aslam Sheikhupuri.

Literary works 
Safdar’s books include:
 Al-Kalam al-Mufeed fi Asbatit al-Taqleed
 [ Al-Minhāj Al-Vāz̤iḥ] 2009
 Tawdih al-Maram fil Nuzul al-Masih (AS)
 Al-Kalam al-Havi fi Tahqiq ‘Ibarah al-Tahawi
 Al Maslak Al Mansoor Fi Kitabil Mastoor
 Itmam Ul Burhan
 Rah-e-Hidayat
 Irshad Ush Shia
 Eesaiyat Ka Pas e Manzar 
 Hukm az Zikr bil Jahr
 Al Shihab al Mubeen
 Ibaraat-e-Akabir

References

1914 births
2009 deaths
Pakistani Islamic religious leaders
Darul Uloom Deoband alumni
People from Mansehra District
Pakistani Sunni Muslim scholars of Islam
Deobandis
Muslim missionaries
Pakistani religious writers